Undercover Law (Spanish title: La ley secreta) is a Colombian drama television series produced by Caracol Televisión that premiered via streaming on 31 August 2018 on Netflix. It stars Viña Machado, Luna Baxter, Juana del Río, Valeria Galviz, Tommy Vásquez, Luis Mesa, Katherine Vélez, Variel Sánchez, Ricardo Vesga, y Juan Manuel Mendoza. The series is based on real-life facts of a group of women who make up a group of special police forces. The production of the series began on 30 October 2017 and it is available in 4K Ultra-high-definition television.

For Colombia through Caracol Television is released on October 1, 2019

Cast 
 Viña Machado as Sandra Medina
 Luna Baxter as Tatiana Ariza
 Juana del Río as Amelia Gómez
 Valeria Galviz as María Alejandra Álvarez Bernal
 Sara Pinzón as Kimberly 
 Tommy Vásquez as Juan Pablo Davila
 Luis Mesa as Cristobal Porto
 Katherine Vélez as María Emma Maldonado Vargas
 Variel Sánchez as Lerner Jr.
 Ricardo Vesga as Rodrigo Mendez
 Juan Manuel Mendoza as Eduardo Celis
 Camilo Amores as Sergio Gómez
 Tata Ariza as Jenifer Carriazo
 Toto Vega as Francisco Correa
 Wilderman Garcia Buitrago as Diego
 Marcela Vanegas as Marcela Rojas
 Manuela González as Catalina
 Tatiana Rentería as Genoveva
 Patrick Delmas as Simon Binoche
 Maria Cecilia Botero as Bertha

References

External links 
 
 

2018 Colombian television series debuts
2018 Colombian television series endings
Colombian television series
Spanish-language Netflix original programming
Television shows set in Colombia
Works about Mexican drug cartels